Aner Dam, is an earthfill dam on Aner river in Shirpur taluka, Dhule district in state of Maharashtra in India.
The dam is 8 km from Hisale village which is situated near Shirpur-Chopda state highway in Shirpur Tehsil.

Specifications

Purpose
 Irrigation

See also
 Dams in Maharashtra
 List of reservoirs and dams in India

References

Gravity dams
Dams in Western Ghats
Dams in Dhule district
Dams completed in 1978
1978 establishments in Maharashtra
20th-century architecture in India